Calabrian earthquakes may refer to:

1638 Calabrian earthquakes
1783 Calabrian earthquakes